The Granby Prédateurs ("Predators") were a junior ice hockey team founded in 1981 after the team moved from Sorel-Tracy, Quebec, where they had been known as the Sorel Éperviers.  The team had been known as the Granby Bisons, but changed their name to the Prédateurs in 1995. They played at Arena Leonard Grondin in Granby, Quebec, Canada.

However, the combination of a small, aging arena and low attendance forced the team to move soon after. In 1997 the Prédateurs moved to Sydney, Nova Scotia, where they became the Cape Breton Screaming Eagles.

NHL alumni
National Hockey League alumni from the Prédateurs two seasons include Philippe Audet, Francis Bouillon, Xavier Delisle, Jason Doig, Daniel Goneau, Benoit Gratton and Georges Laraque.  Michel Therrien, who had coached the team to the Memorial Cup, later coached the Montreal Canadiens.

Season-by-season record
 Granby Prédateurs (1995–1997)

Note :Pct = Winning percentage

References

Defunct Quebec Major Junior Hockey League teams
Sport in Granby, Quebec
1995 establishments in Quebec
1997 disestablishments in Quebec
Ice hockey clubs established in 1995
Ice hockey clubs disestablished in 1997